Edmonds is a neighbourhood in the southeast of Burnaby, British Columbia, Canada. It is considered one of four town centres by the city of Burnaby. The SkyTrain's Edmonds station serves the area.

Demographics
An area mainly encompassing single family homes, low-rise apartments, and small businesses, Edmonds is believed to house one of the most diverse neighbourhoods in the world.

Notes

References

Neighbourhoods in Burnaby